A senate is a deliberative assembly, often the upper house or chamber of a bicameral legislature. The name comes from the ancient Roman Senate (Latin: Senatus), so-called as an assembly of the senior (Latin: senex meaning "the elder" or "old man") and therefore considered wiser and more experienced members of the society or ruling class. However the Roman Senate was not the ancestor or predecessor of modern parliamentarism in any sense, because the Roman senate was not a legislative body.

Many countries have an assembly named a senate, composed of senators who may be elected, appointed, have inherited the title, or gained membership by other methods, depending on the country. Modern senates typically serve to provide a chamber of "sober second thought" to consider legislation passed by a lower house, whose members are usually elected. Most senates have asymmetrical duties and powers compared with their respective lower house meaning they have special duties, for example to fill important political positions or to pass special laws. Conversely many senates have limited powers in changing or stopping bills under consideration and efforts to stall or veto a bill may be bypassed by the lower house or another branch of government.

Overview

The modern word Senate is derived from the Latin word senātus (senate), which comes from senex, 'old man'. The members or legislators of a senate are called senators. The Latin word senator was adopted into English with no change in spelling. Its meaning is derived from a very ancient form of social organization, in which advisory or decision-making powers are reserved for the eldest men. For the same reason, the word senate is correctly used when referring to any powerful authority characteristically composed by the eldest members of a community, as a deliberative body of a faculty in an institution of higher learning is often called a senate. This form of adaptation was used to show the power of those in body and for the decision-making process to be thorough, which could take a long period of time. The original senate was the Roman Senate, which lasted until at least AD 603, although various efforts to revive it were made in Medieval Rome. In the Eastern Roman Empire, the Byzantine Senate continued until the Fourth Crusade, circa 1202–1204.

Modern democratic states with bicameral parliamentary systems are sometimes equipped with a senate, often distinguished from an ordinary parallel lower house, known variously as the "House of Representatives", "House of Commons", "Chamber of Deputies", "National Assembly", "Legislative Assembly", or "House of Assembly", by electoral rules. This may include minimum age required for voters and candidates, one house employing a proportional voting system and the other being elected on a majoritarian or plurality basis, and an electoral basis or collegium. Typically, the senate is referred to as the upper house and has a smaller membership than the lower house. In some federal states senates also exist at the subnational level. In the United States, most states and territories have senates, with the exception of Nebraska, Guam, and the U.S. Virgin Islands (whose legislatures are unicameral bodies called the "Legislature" but whose members refer to themselves as "senators") and the District of Columbia (whose unicameral legislature is called the Council).  There is also the US Senate at the federal level. Similarly in Argentina, in addition to the Senate at federal level, eight of the country's provinces, Buenos Aires, Catamarca, Corrientes, Entre Ríos, Mendoza, Salta, San Luis (since 1987) and Santa Fe, have bicameral legislatures with a Senate. Córdoba and Tucumán changed to unicameral systems in 2001 and 2003 respectively.

In Australia and Canada, only the upper house of the federal parliament is known as the Senate. All Australian states other than Queensland have an upper house known as a Legislative council. Several Canadian provinces also once had a Legislative Council, but these have all been abolished, the last being Quebec's Legislative council in 1968.

In Germany, the last Senate of a State parliament, the Senate of Bavaria, was abolished in 1999.

Senate membership can be determined either through elections or appointments. For example, elections are held every three years for half the membership of the Senate of the Philippines, the term of a senator being six years. In contrast, members of the Canadian Senate are appointed by the Governor General upon the recommendation of the Prime Minister of Canada, holding the office until they resign, are removed, or retire at the mandatory age of 75.

Alternative meanings

The terms senate and senator, however, do not necessarily refer to a second chamber of a legislature:
The Senate of Finland was, until 1918, the executive branch and the supreme court.
The Senate of Latvia (lv) fulfilled a similar judicial function during the interbellum (1918–1940).
In German politics:
In the Bundesländer (Federated States) of Germany which form a City State (in German: Stadtstaat), i.e. Berlin (Senate of Berlin), Bremen (Senate of Bremen) and Hamburg (Senate of Hamburg), the senates (Senat in German) are the executive branch, with senators (Senator) being the holders of ministerial portfolios.
In a number of cities which were former members of the Hanse (a medieval confederacy of port cities mainly at the shores of the Baltic Sea and the North Sea), such as Greifswald, Lübeck, Rostock, Stralsund, or Wismar, the city government is also called a Senate. However, in Bavaria, the Senate was a second legislative chamber until its abolition in 1999.
In German jurisprudence:
The term Senat (senate) in higher courts of appeal refers to the "bench" in its broader metonymy meaning, describing members of the judiciary collectively (usually five judges), often occupied with a particular subject-matter jurisdiction. However, the judges are not called "senators". The German term Strafsenat (literally "Penal Senate") in a German court translates to Bench of penal-law jurisdiction and Zivilsenat (literally "Civil Senate") to Bench of private-law jurisdiction. The Federal Constitutional Court of Germany consists of two senates of eight judges each. In its case the division is mostly of an organizational nature, as a matter of dividing the work load; both senates handle the same kind of constitutional cases. At some points in the past, one senate was considered more conservative and the other more liberal, but that is not the case as of 2011.
In Scotland, judges of the High Court of Justiciary are called Senators of the College of Justice.
In some, mostly federal countries with a unicameral legislature, some of the legislators are elected differently from the others and are called senators. In federal countries, such senators represent the territories, while the other members represent the people at large (this device is used to allow a federal representation without having to establish a bicameral legislature); this is the case with St. Kitts and Nevis, Comoros and Micronesia. In other, non-federal countries, the use of the term senator marks some other difference between such members and the rest of the legislators (such as the method of selection); this is the case with Dominica's House of Assembly and the Saint Vincent House of Assembly. Until 2022, this was also the case in the States of Jersey.
In Wales, there is a translation of the word Senatus into the Welsh language (equivalent to 'Senate' in English) as the word "Senedd". The word was used first to refer specifically to what is now referred to as the Senedd building, but the name later became a metonym for the devolved unicameral legislature it hosts, the "National Assembly for Wales", which in May 2020 adopted the name "Senedd Cymru" or "the Welsh Parliament" with the term "Senedd" becoming the common short name for the institution in both languages of Welsh and English. There is no direct translation of the word "Parliament" in Welsh, with Senedd (being a cognate of Senate) meaning both "Senate" and "Parliament". 
An academic senate is the governing body of some universities.
In Greece during the early stages of the Greek War of Independence, various local legislative and executive bodies were established by the Greek rebels. Two of them were styled "senate": the Peloponnesian Senate and the Senate of Western Continental Greece.

List of national senates

Defunct and unestablished senates

Notes

See also

Senator for life

References

External links

Livius.org: Roman Senate
Encyclopedia Britannica on Senate

Legislatures
 Senate